Rosa Rankin-Gee (born 1986) is a British writer based in Ramsgate.

Rankin-Gee was brought up in Kensal Rise, London. She studied at Durham University. After leaving university with a degree in modern languages she moved to Sark in the Channel Islands, where she worked as a private cook. Her first novella, The Last Kings of Sark, won the inaugural Paris Literary Prize in 2011 and was later published by Virago.

References

Living people
21st-century English novelists
English women novelists
Alumni of Hatfield College, Durham
21st-century English women writers
1986 births